Lilia Michel (July 30, 1926 – August 10, 2011) was a Mexican television and film actress most active during the Golden Age of Mexican cinema, earning her the nickname of "the jewel" of the film era.

Michel was born Lilia Fernández Larios on July 30, 1926, in Teapa, Tabasco, Mexico. She became well known for her role in the 1946 Mexican film Dizziness, in which she co-starred María Félix. Michel later switched to television, earning numerous roles in telenovelas, including Aprendiendo a Vivir, María la del Barrio and Rosalía.

Lilia Michel died in Mexico City on August 10, 2011, at the age of 85.

Filmography

Films
 1998 Fuera de la ley
 1982 Una sota y un caballo: Rancho Avándaro
 1978 Los amantes fríos
 1977 Fantoche
 1975 La lucha con la pantera
 1975 Yo amo, tú amas, nosotros...
 1973 El amor tiene cara de mujer
 1973 Eva y Darío
 1972 La inocente
 1972 La pequeña señora de Pérez
 1969 La muñeca perversa
 1953 Sí, mi vida
 1953 Había una vez un marido
 1952 Sígueme, corazón
 1950 La gota de sangre
 1946 El pasajero diez mil
 1946 No basta ser charro
 1946 Una virgen moderna
 1946 Dizziness (Vértigo)
 1945 The Hour of Truth
 1945 Corazones de México
 1945 El jagüey de las ruinas
 1945 Twilight 
 1945 Un beso en la noche
 1944 Así son ellas
 1944 Nana

References

External links

1926 births
2011 deaths
Ariel Award winners
Mexican film actresses
Mexican television actresses
Mexican telenovela actresses